The following are the national records in athletics in Lesotho maintained by Lesotho Amateur Athletics Association (LAAA).

Outdoor

Key to tables:

+ = en route to a longer distance

A = affected by altitude

Men

Women

Indoor

Men

Women

References
General
World Athletics Statistic Handbook 2019: National Outdoor Records
World Athletics Statistic Handbook 2018: National Indoor Records
Specific

External links

Lesotho
Records